Pardners is a lost 1917 silent feature drama written by Paul Sloane and starring Charlotte Walker. It is based on a Rex Beach story. The film was produced by the Edison Company and released through Mutual Film.

A one reel short of this Rex Beach story was produced in 1910 by Thomas Edison under the title of Pardners.

Cast

References

External links

1917 films
American silent feature films
Lost American films
1917 drama films
Silent American drama films
American black-and-white films
Films based on works by Rex Beach
Mutual Film films
1917 lost films
Lost drama films
1910s American films